Saddick Adams, also known as Sports Obama, is a Ghanaian sports journalist and winner of the GJA awards in 2018 for his work in sports journalism.

Education 
He started his basic education at Adrobaa Roman Catholic school around Duayaw Nkwanta in the Ahafo Region. He moved to Kumasi at age nine to continue his basic education from St. Peters Basic, Bantama M/A school and finally completed his basic education at Islamic Educational Complex in Kumasi. He then attended Asanteman Senior High School and had his tertiary education at Sunyani Technical University. When he was on campus, he goes to the stadium when there is a game at hand and reports what happens on the field to his colleagues.

Career 
He started his early career in sport journalism as an intern at Radio Parrot which was a campus base radio station at  Sunyani Technical University. He was in 2018 upgraded to the Head of Sports at Atinka FM. He was appointed manager of Angel FM/TV in Accra where he doubles as a presenter. He has also written for several sports platforms including Ghana Sports Newspaper, Ghanasportsonline.com and the BBC, SuperSport, BeIN Sport and China Global Television Network (CGTN) covering the West Africa sports sub-region.

His pseudonym was given to him by his audience in Sunyani who saw the changes he was bringing into the field of sports journalism as at the time when Barack Obama was campaigning for change earned him the name Sports Obama.

He is a specialist when it comes to Football in Africa

Awards 
He won the 2018 Ghana Journalists Association (GJA) sports journalist Awards of the year.

References 

Living people
Ghanaian Muslims
Ghanaian radio journalists
Ghanaian sports journalists
Ghanaian sportswriters
Year of birth missing (living people)